Several ships of the British Royal Navy have been named HMS Boxer, named after the competitor in a boxing match.
  was an  launched in 1797 and sold in 1809.
  was a  launched in 1812 that the US Navy captured in 1813 during the War of 1812.
 There was a Boxer that on 8 April 1814 participated in boat service that resulted in the destruction of 27 vessels and a quantity of stores up the Connecticut River and for which the Royal Navy issued a clasp to the Naval General Service Medal.
  was a paddle steamer formerly called Ivanhoe bought by the Royal Navy in 1837 and sold in 1841.
Construction was started in 1846 but she was cancelled before being completed.
  was a  launched in 1868 and sold for scrap in 1887.
  was an  launched in 1894 and sunk in a collision with SS St Patrick on 8 February 1918.
  was an LST that served during the Allied invasion of Italy in World War II. The vessel was later used as a  fighter direction ship and after the war, a radar training vessel.
  was a Type 22 frigate, launched in 1981, paid off in 1999 and sunk as a target in August 2004.

Battle honours 
Ships named Boxer have earned the following battle honours:
Crimea, 1855
Sicily, 1943
Salerno, 1944
Anzio, 1944

See also

References

Royal Navy ship names